Jimmy Jax Pinchak (born James Justin Pinchak; February 16, 1996) is an American former actor and musician.

Life and career
Born James Justin Pinchak, he grew up in Point Pleasant, New Jersey. He acted the movements for "Know-It-All" in the computer-animated movie The Polar Express (voice was provided by Eddie Deezen) and played the lead in made-for-TV movie All I Want For Christmas, Hostage and Meteor. He also played Eddy in Over There and Mark in Let Me In, a remake of the Swedish film Let the Right One In. In 2008, he starred in the pilot episode of the family comedy Growing Up Normal about a child actor growing up in Hollywood. In 2011,  Jimmy made a guest appearance on NCIS. In 2010-2011, Pinchak played a recurring role in Ray Romano's Men of a Certain Age on TNT. In 2013, Pinchak played Peter Wiggin, the older brother of Ender Wiggin, in the film Ender's Game (2013).

In addition to acting, Pinchak is a blues rock musician. In 2014, The Jimmy Jax Pinchak Band released a blues rock album titled Make It Better. In 2018, The Jimmy J Pinchak Band released Blue on Arrival.

Pinchak is a self-taught magician, and has been a member of The Magic Castle since 2007.

Pinchak received his Juris Doctor degree from Cornell Law School in 2021 and his Bachelor of Science degree from Cornell University in 2018.

Filmography

References

External links
 

1996 births
Male actors from New Jersey
American male child actors
American male film actors
American male television actors
Living people
People from Point Pleasant, New Jersey
21st-century American male actors